Ovila Légaré (21 July 1901 - 19 February 1978) was a French-Canadian actor and singer from Quebec.

Life
Légaré was born in Montreal on 21 July 1901, and died there on 19 February 1978.

Career
He was a folklorist, singer, actor, script-writer, and host. Originally a violinist, he injured his hand in a printing accident and took up theatre and singing. He also had a number of significant roles on radio.

He starred in films including Footsteps in the Snow (1966) and on television, including Quentin Durgens, M.P.

Filmography

References

External links
 Discography
 

1901 births
1978 deaths
Male actors from Quebec
20th-century Canadian male actors
Burials at Notre Dame des Neiges Cemetery